Catherine Haste, Lady Bragg (6 August 1945 – 29 April 2021) was an English author, biographer, historian and documentary film director,  who worked freelance for major television networks in the UK and US over a period of 40 years.

Television documentaries
Haste directed political and historical documentaries and series, including Munich: The Peace of Paper. For Cold War, Jeremy Isaacs' 24-part series, Haste directed five films. She directed Flashback TV's Hitler's Brides about women in Nazi Germany; produced Death of a Democrat in Secret History, the series broadcast by Channel 4; and Married to the Prime Minister, presented by Cherie Blair, the wife of the then Prime Minister, Tony Blair.

Books
Haste’s first book, Keep the Home Fires Burning (1977), was described by journalist Phillip Knightley as: "One can only hope that this important book will make it more difficult for any British government so deeply to deceive its people ever again." Maureen Freely wrote that Rules of Desire (1997) was "as diverting and as suggestive as a very good novel.... temperate, balanced, subtle and humane". The Daily Telegraph critic wrote that Nazi Women: Hitler’s Seduction of a Nation (2001) "opens up the bizarre moral universe of the Third Reich ....at once comprehensible and compelling, and at times deeply moving. It is media history at its best." The prize-winning Sheila Fell: A Passion for Paint (2010), a biography/monograph of the Cumbrian Expressionist landscape painter, signalled Haste’s shift to biography and was, according to Andrew Lambirth, "a handsome, slim volume ....elegantly and deftly put together".

Personal life and death
Haste was one of three surviving daughters of Eric and Margaret Haste. She was married from 1973 to 2018 to the broadcaster Melvyn Bragg, whom she met at a protest; the couple had two children, Tom and Alice. She was a member of English PEN, the British Academy of Film and Television Arts (BAFTA), the Writers' Guild of Great Britain and Directors UK (formerly Directors Guild of Great Britain), and had been a trustee of Index on Censorship and World Film Collective.

She lived in Hampstead, north London, and like her former husband was a member of the Labour Party. She died from cancer in April 2021, aged 75.

Bibliography
 Passionate Spirit: The Life of Alma Mahler
 Craigie Aitchison: A Life in Colour
 Sheila Fell: A Passion for Paint
 Clarissa Eden A Memoir: From Churchill to Ede (ed.)
 The Goldfish Bowl, with Cherie Booth
 Nazi Women: Hitler’s Seduction of a Nation
 Rules of Desire
 Keep The Home Fires Burning

Filmography
 Married to the Prime Minister (Flashback TV for Channel 4) 2005 
 Hitler’s Brides (Flashback TV for Channel 4) 2000; part of series titled Nazi Women
 Millennium (Jeremy Isaacs Productions/CNN/BBC) 1999
 Cold War (CNN) 1998
 Cold War (Jeremy Isaacs Productions/CNN/BBC2) 1996–98; 24-part series
 Secret History: Death of a Democrat (Brook Associates for Channel 4/Arts and Entertainment)
 Munich: The Peace of Paper... (Brook Associates for Thames Television/ WGBH, Boston) 1988

References 

1945 births
2021 deaths
English women non-fiction writers
English television directors
English television producers
British women television producers
British television producers
British women television directors